Jehovah's Witnesses experienced religious persecution in Canada during World War II because of their evangelical fervour and objection to compulsory military service. In 1940, Jehovah's Witnesses were banned as an illegal organization under the War Measures Act.

World War II
During the late 1930s, Witnesses were tried for sedition because their literature attacked the clergy and political leaders of the country. Joseph Franklin Rutherford, the second president of the Watch Tower Bible and Tract Society of Pennsylvania, was prohibited from broastcasting on Canadian radio stations.

In 1940, one year following Canada's entry into World War II, the Jehovah's Witnesses denomination was banned under the War Measures Act. This ban continued until 1943. During this period, some of their children were expelled from school; other children were placed in foster homes or juvenile detention and members were jailed. Men who refused to enter the army were sent to work camps. Twenty-nine Witnesses were convicted and sentenced to terms averaging one year.

Quebec 

From 1936 to 1959, Jehovah's Witnesses faced religious and civil opposition in Quebec.  Historically, the Roman Catholic Church had been the dominant institution in the life of the province of Quebec and a major influence on French Canadian culture. After World War II, the Church came under attack by the Jehovah's Witnesses who challenged its doctrines.  They were determined to seek Catholic converts.  In response, the Duplessis regime mounted a campaign of persecution against Jehovah's Witnesses and communists.  The result was a legal struggle between the Duplessis regime and lawyers such as Frank Scott and Pierre Trudeau who argued in defence of the rights of minorities.

Saumur v The City of Quebec

In 1953, the case of Saumur v Quebec (City of) (1953) 25 CR 299 (in which a Jehovah's Witness challenged a Quebec City bylaw prohibiting public distribution of literature without a permit) left the question of religious freedom undecided as: "both Parliament and the provinces could validly limit freedom of worship providing they did so in the course of legislating on some other subject which lay within their respective powers."

This decision was part of a series of cases the Supreme Court dealt with concerning the rights of Jehovah's Witnesses under the Duplessis government of Quebec. Previous to this there was the case of R. v. Boucher [1951] S.C.R. 265 that upheld the right to distribute pamphlets.

Roncarelli v Duplessis 
Subsequent to Saumur was the case of Roncarelli v Duplessis [1959] S.C.R. 121. The court held that in 1946 Maurice Duplessis, both Premier and Attorney General of Quebec, had overstepped his authority by ordering the manager of the Liquor Commission to revoke the liquor licence of Frank Roncarelli, a Montreal restaurant owner and Jehovah's Witness who was an outspoken critic of the Roman Catholic Church in Quebec. Roncarelli provided bail for Jehovah's Witnesses arrested for distributing pamphlets attacking the Roman Catholic Church. The Supreme Court found Duplessis personally liable for  $33,123.56 in damages plus Roncarelli's court costs.

Other cases
In several other cases, including Chaput v Romain (1955) and Lamb v Benoit (1959), Jehovah's Witnesses successfully sued the police for damages. In Chaput v. Romain, police had raided a home where a religious service by Jehovah’s Witnesses was being conducted, seized bibles and other religious paraphernalia, and disrupted the service despite not having a warrant and no charges being laid. In Lamb v. Benoit, a Jehovah's Witness, was arrested for distributing religious pamphlets in Verdun, Quebec, in 1946, along with three other members of the religion. She was accused by the plaintiff of distributing copies of Quebec's Burning Hate, but the Supreme Court found no evidence of that specific pamphlet being distributed. Lamb was detained for a weekend without access to legal counsel. Local authorities offered to release Lamb if she would not hold them responsible for her detention, but she refused. She was then charged with conspiracy to publish sedition, but this was dismissed by a trial judge and that decision was upheld when appealed.

Canadian Bill of Rights

In order to obtain religious freedom, Jehovah's Witnesses in Canada helped promote the creation of a national bill of rights. In 1946, a provincial bill had been enacted ensuring religious freedom through the Saskatchewan Bill of Rights. On June 9, 1947, Jehovah's Witnesses presented a petition to Canada's parliament for the enactment of a similar bill, followed by a similar petition in 1949. John Diefenbaker became an advocate of the bill. The Canadian Bill of Rights was the precursor to the Canadian Charter of Rights and Freedoms which is part of the Canadian constitution.

See also
 Persecution of Jehovah's Witnesses in the United States
 Persecution of Jehovah's Witnesses in Nazi Germany
 Internment of Japanese Canadians
 Italian Canadian internment
 Ukrainian Canadian internment
 Jehovah's Witnesses and governments

References

Canada
Canadian freedom of religion case law
Religion in Canada
Christian nonviolence